Garratts Wood is a woodland in Somerset, England, near the village of Winsford. It is owned and managed by the Woodland Trust.

References

Forests and woodlands of Somerset